JS Akizuki (DD-115) is the lead ship of Akizuki-class destroyers. She was commissioned on 14 March 2012.

Construction and career
Akizuki was laid down at Mitsubishi Heavy Industries Nagasaki Shipyard & Machinery Works on July 17, 2009 as the 2007 plan 5,000-ton type escort ship No. 2244 based on the medium-term defense capability development plan, launched and named on October 13, 2010. Launch, the public trial started on July 28, 2011, commissioned on March 14, 2012, and was incorporated into the 5th escort group of the 1st escort group. The fixed port is Sasebo base.

On July 5, 2015, as the 22nd dispatched anti-piracy action surface corps, sailed from Sasebo base to the Gulf of Aden off the coast of Somalia with JS Sawagiri.

On April 18, 2021, she departed from Sasebo base as the 5th dispatch information gathering activity water squadron.  In addition to conducting PCR tests on all crew members, we plan to conduct training, etc. for 14 days in the waters near Japan, observe the health of the crew members, and then advance toward the Middle East.  Take over the mission from "Suzunami".

Gallery

References

 

2010 ships
Ships built by Mitsubishi Heavy Industries
Akizuki-class destroyers (2010)